Moussa Sane (born 18 January 1997) is a Senegalese professional footballer who plays as a forward.

Career
Sane signed on loan with Major League Soccer side Orlando City SC on 3 March 2017. He made 3 appearances for Orlando City B.

References

External links 
 

1997 births
Living people
Senegalese footballers
Senegalese expatriate footballers
Orlando City SC players
Orlando City B players
Association football forwards
Expatriate soccer players in the United States
USL Championship players
Montverde Academy alumni